Tabuna refers to:

 Dominic Tabuna (b. 1980), Nauruan politician
 Grammonota tabuna, a species of spider
 Tabuna, a cultivar of Karuka